Tang Shah may refer to:
 Tang Shah, Kerman
 Tang Shah, Khuzestan